Lothaire is French masculine given name that is a modern form of the Germanic Chlothar (which is a blended form of Hlūdaz and Harjaz). People with this name include:

Surname
 Hubert Lothaire (1865 – 1929), Belgian military officer

Given name 
 Lothaire Bluteau (born 1957), Canadian actor

Nickname/pseudonym/stage name
M. Lothaire pseudonym of a group of mathematicians
Sophie Lothaire, stage name of Marguerite-Louise Odiot de Montroty, (born 1732), French dancer, actress and director

See also 

Lothair (disambiguation)

References

Masculine given names
French masculine given names